Robert B. Griffiths (February 25, 1937) is an American physicist at Carnegie Mellon University. He is the originator of the consistent histories approach to quantum mechanics, which has since been developed by himself, Roland Omnès, Murray Gell-Mann, and James Hartle.

Early life and education
Robert B. Griffiths was born in Etah, Uttar Pradesh in 1937 to Presbyterian missionaries. Griffiths attended Woodstock School, India from fourth standard to tenth, along with his brothers and sisters. Even during his Woodstock days, Griffiths' mathematical and scientific aptitude was apparent. The 1952 year book remarks that "Robert is famous for his long arguments (and unsurpassed knowledge) in chemistry class, his ability to 'recite' the log tables indelibly written in his brain, and his skill when it comes to fixing anything electrical." This knack for electrical systems kept Griffiths at Woodstock through part of 1953, working with the school's various wiring systems.

Academic career
Following his time at Woodstock, Griffiths attended Princeton University where he earned a BA in Physics in 1957. He then earned both an MSc and PhD in Physics from Stanford University in 1958 and 1962 respectively. He was a Postdoctoral Fellow of the University of California, San Diego, from 1962–1964, Assistant Professor at Carnegie Mellon University from 1964–1967, becoming Associate Professor in 1967 and Professor in 1969. Since that time, Griffiths' academic contributions have been widely recognized. Robert Griffiths was awarded a Phi Beta Kappa in 1956, was a National Science Foundation Postdoctoral Fellow from 1962–1964, an Alfred P. Sloan Research Fellow from 1966–1968, a John Simon Guggenheim Memorial Foundation Fellow in 1972, and was given the US Senior Scientist Award of the Alexander von Humboldt Foundation in 1973. In 1981, he was awarded the A. Cressy Morrison Award of the New York Academy of Sciences, in 1984, the Dannie Heineman Prize for Mathematical Physics, and in 1987 he was elected to the National Academy of Sciences.

Griffiths is well known for his research on statistical mechanics in the sixties
and seventies of the last century, including exact inequalities in the Ising model and the introduction of the Blume-Emery-Griffiths (BEG) model, 
describing tricritical points.

Within his more recent work and research, Griffiths' primary focus has been in the field of quantum mechanics. Of the research, he has noted that "Quantum mechanics is hard to understand not only because it involves unfamiliar mathematics, but also because the usual discussion in textbooks about how to relate the mathematics to the real world is incomplete". It is this application of quantum information to the real world that Griffiths strives for. In 1984, he initiated a research program which sought to supply the missing link between theory and application while working out an entirely consistent form of quantum theory. Along with contributions of several key colleagues, the project eventually resulted in what is now commonly called the consistent (or decoherent) history approach to quantum theory, now effectively studied and applied in several areas of the field of quantum mechanics.

At present, Griffiths is the Otto Stern University Professor of Physics at Carnegie Mellon University. He has published over 140 articles, as well as the book Consistent Quantum Theory. He is a member of Sigma Xi, a Fellow of the American Physical Society and a Fellow of the American Scientific Affiliation. Griffiths' research interests continue to include the foundations of quantum mechanics, quantum computation, and the relation of physical science and Christian theology.

References

External links

 Consistent Histories: Questions and Answers
 Home Page of Robert B. Griffiths

Living people
1937 births
Members of the United States National Academy of Sciences
Carnegie Mellon University faculty
American Christians
American people of Welsh descent
20th-century American physicists
21st-century American scientists